Willis is an unincorporated community in Knox County, Indiana, in the United States.

History
The first post office in Willis was called Willis Grove. Established in 1879, the post office was renamed Willis in 1894, and was discontinued in 1907.

References

Unincorporated communities in Knox County, Indiana
Unincorporated communities in Indiana